Tennant Peak is a peak 1 nautical mile (1.9 km) south of Gould Peak in the south group of the Rockefeller Mountains on Edward VII Peninsula. Discovered by the Byrd Antarctic Expedition (1928–30) and named by Byrd for George W. Tennant, cook on the expedition.

Mountains of King Edward VII Land